is a cover album by Japanese singer/songwriter Yōko Oginome. Released through Victor Entertainment on August 20, 2014 to celebrate Oginome's 30th anniversary, the album features covers of popular western songs, as well as self-covers of her past hits. A limited edition release includes a DVD containing a new music video for "Dancing Hero (Eat You Up)" and some live performances.

The album peaked at No. 38 on Oricon's albums chart.

Track listing 

 Tracks 3–4 recorded from Verge of Love: Budokan Live (Nippon Budokan, 1989)
 Tracks 5–7 recorded from Pop Liberation Force (Tokyo Kōsei Nenkin Kaikan, 1992)

Charts

References

External links
 
 
  

2014 albums
Yōko Oginome albums
Covers albums
Japanese-language albums
Victor Entertainment albums